The Blue Things (also known as The Bluethings) were a folk rock and, later, psychedelic band from Hays, Kansas that existed from 1964 to 1968, recording one LP and several singles for RCA Records in '66 and '67. The RCA recordings remain their best-known material, although they had previously released singles through Ruff Records, a tiny Texas label. Today the Blue Things are remembered as one of the best bands to come out of the Midwest in the 60's, although they were unheard of outside of the Midwest in their brief lifespan, and remain largely unheard to this day.

Beginnings 

The Blue Things formed as The Blue Boys at Fort Hays State College from the ashes of a Hays R&B band, the Barons. From the Barons came Mike Chapman (lead guitar and vocals) formerly with Pat and Lolly Vegas, Richard Scott, bassist and vocalist formerly with the Flippers (later known as The Fabulous Flippers) and Rick "Laz" Larzalere (drums and vocals). With a summer tour booked the trio decided they needed a fourth member and soon found a lead singer and rhythm guitarist in Mike's roommate, Val Stoecklein. Stoecklein had previously released an album with a college folk group, the Impromptwos (in which he was featured on lead vocals), and cut a demo of two original compositions ("Desert Wind" and "Nancy Whiskey") with another group, the Hi-Plains Singers. At the time, Stoecklein had been singing folk music around the college, successfully auditioning for the band in May 1964.

On their ensuing summer tour, the band found a manager in Jim Reardon, who in turn got the band signed with John Brown's Mid-Continent Co. booking agency. Reardon used what was left of his old sweatshirt business to manufacture Blue Boys sweatshirts, in addition to starting a fan club, complete with membership cards. Keeping true to their name, the Blue Boys wore matching blue suits and played blue guitars. The group reportedly earned fees as large as $1200 for playing colleges and high schools throughout Kansas, Nebraska and Colorado.

Although their live set was mostly Top 40 and British Invasion covers, Stoecklein, Scott and Chapman began composing songs for the band to record, which they did in the fall of '64. At Damon Recording Studios in Kansas City, the Blue Boys demoed five Stoecklein originals and two covers (Dale Hawkins' "La Do Da Da" and Buddy Holly's "Love's Made a Fool of You,". "La Do Da Da" would eventually be re-cut for their RCA album). (Several of these demos have since surfaced on Cicadelic Records' and Collectables Records' "The Blue Things Story" series.) The demos attracted Texas' Ruff Records, who subsequently signed the group.

From the "Blue Boys" to the "Blue Things" 

In December 1964, the Blue Boys cut their first single for Ruff at Gene Sullivan's studio in Oklahoma City: Ronnie Hawkins "Mary Lou" and Val's own "Your Turn to Cry." But by the time of the single's February 1965 release, the Blue Boys had now become the Blue Things, in order to avoid confusion (and possible legal wrangles) with the late Jim Reeves' backing group. The single charted in the Top 40 in Oklahoma City, thanks to 50,000 watt radio station KOMA, whose publicity of the group would subsequently help the band sign with RCA.

Their next single, "Pretty Things-Oh" b/w "Just Two Days Ago," was cut in Texas, and once again was a Midwest smash. After recording another six-song demo in Texas (this time with only two Stecklein and one Scott originals), the band left Ruff Records over a royalty dispute (They reportedly received no royalties from either of their singles, however, this did not stop Stecklein from working with Ruff's Ray Ruff later in his solo career).

At this point, John Brown managed to get the Blue Things a deal with RCA, based on their reputation as Midwest superstars of-sorts. Before they could record for RCA, one more change was made to the band: Drummer Rick Larzalere left the band to focus on school. After several unsuccessful replacements, Bobby Day from Salina, Kansas was chosen.

RCA (1965-1967) 

The Blue Things first RCA single, "I Must Be Doing Something Wrong" (written by the three remaining band members) b/w a remake of "La Do Da Da," was released in October 1965. A session drummer was used for the single sessions (in Nashville), as Larzalere had left and Day still had yet to join. Ray Walker, the bass singer from Elvis Presley's backing group The Jordanaires was used by producer Felton Jarvis to augment the group's vocal sound on "I Must Be Doing Something Wrong." and was the only non-Bluething vocal ever recorded. Once again, the single charted locally, but failed to chart outside of the Midwest.

The following single, while repeating the chart action of the band's previous RCA single, at least gained the band some notoriety. The A-side, "Doll House," sympathetically told the story of a  prostitute, and criticized the role of a "Doll House" (read: brothel) in society. Although it was a bold statement at the time, the single stiffed when Time Magazine did a feature on supposedly obscene lyrics in rock music, citing "Doll House" as an example. The B-side, "Man on the Street," took a similar social-critique theme. While the two sides were wholly representative of the Blue Things now fully formed "folk-rock" sound ("Doll House" remaining one of their signature tunes), both songs were from outside sources: "Doll House" was penned by little-known country songwriter Marge Barton, and "Man on the Street" by equally obscure rockabilly artist Ronnie Self. The LP "Listen and See" was released shortly after the Doll House single from June 1966. While this album was popular with Blue Things fans, by the time it came out the band had moved past the folk rock/Merseybeat sound, that RCA favored, to a more psychedelic sound. For a group that was always defining the cutting edge for bands on the plains, music didn't stand still for the Blue Things. The Blue Things' January 1967 Nashville session and last with Val Stecklein produced one of the finest examples of psychedelia ever--"Orange Rooftop Of Your Mind" b/w "One Hour Cleaners". Both sides were written by Val & Mike, with Richard helping write "One Hour Cleaners". Bobby Day's backward countdown on "One Hour Cleaners" is his only recorded vocal. In May, 1967 Stecklein left for a solo career, signed with Dot Records and released an album, "Grey Life" in 1968. The remaining Blue Things moved to California and continued to perform concerts, also signed with Dot Records and toured for 14 months before disbanding entirely. In 1971 Stecklein co-wrote a double-LP biblical rock opera, Truth Of Truths, with producer Ray Ruff and former Them bassist Alan Henderson, which featured "Orange Rooftops Of Your Mind" re-recorded with new lyrics as "John the Baptist".

The Blue Things have never held a reunion concert. A collection of their song catalog was released on CD in 1995 and a reissue of their 1966 album on CD was released by BMG in 2001. To demonstrate the respect the Blue Things commanded in their native land, bassist Richard Scott mentioned in the 2001 reissue of their sole album that Barton "asked that we do "Doll House" because we were the only people that she knew that would do it the way she wanted it." Unfortunately, Val died in 1993 in Kansas. Mike has continued to write and perform and has had a successful career in the audio industry in Georgia. Richard has a successful career in the audio industry as well as continuing to write and record his own music and Bobby owns a cabinet company in Kansas.

References

Rock music groups from Kansas
American folk rock groups
RCA Victor artists
Musical groups established in 1964
Musical groups disestablished in 1968